Dynamo Abomey FC are a Beninese football club based in Abomey. They last played in the Benin Premier League during the abandoned 2010/11 season.

References

 
Football clubs in Benin